Cactus Flower is a 1969 American screwball comedy film directed by Gene Saks, and starring Walter Matthau, Ingrid Bergman and Goldie Hawn, who won an Academy Award for her performance.

The screenplay was adapted by I. A. L. Diamond from the 1965 Broadway play of the same name written by Abe Burrows, which in turn was based upon the French play Fleur de cactus by Pierre Barillet and Jean-Pierre Gredy. Cactus Flower was the ninth highest-grossing film of 1969.

Plot
Twenty-one-year-old Toni Simmons attempts to commit suicide by inhaling gas from her stove. Toni's neighbor, Igor Sullivan, smells the gas and rescues her by using mouth-to-mouth resuscitation, which evolves into a kiss after Toni regains consciousness.

Toni's suicide attempt came after being stood up by her lover, Manhattan dentist Julian Winston. Julian had told Toni from the beginning of their relationship that he had a wife and three children. Unbeknownst to Toni, Julian is not married; and Toni hates lying above all other transgressions. Impressed that Toni had been willing to die over him, Julian decides to marry Toni. However, she is concerned for his wife's well-being, and insists on meeting her to ensure that she has agreed to divorce him and will be taken care of. Julian asks Stephanie Dickinson, his longtime nurse, to pose as his wife. At first unwilling, she ultimately relents, since she has long been in love with her employer.

When Toni and Stephanie first meet at the record store where Toni works, Toni senses Stephanie's feelings for Julian and asks Julian to help Stephanie find another man. Julian lies again, telling her that his wife already has a boyfriend. Toni immediately insists on meeting him, and Julian's friend Harvey is enlisted in the role of Stephanie's boyfriend. After a "coincidental" encounter with Stephanie and Harvey at a club, Harvey is swiftly chased off by Julian after his real girlfriend runs into the foursome and humiliates his supposed girlfriend.

Embracing her newfound confidence, Stephanie finally accepts the overtures of Julian's patient Señor Arturo Sánchez, a Latin diplomat. After attending a ball with him, she invites him to the club from the earlier night, where Toni, Julian, and Igor have also returned. Stephanie and Igor quickly hit it off, to the dismay and jealousy of both Julian and Toni. After dancing with gleeful abandon at the club with Igor, Stephanie arrives at work the next morning giddy and still wearing her evening gown from the night before. She happily shares a few vague details with Julian about her night spent on the beach. Stephanie then notices that the cactus on her desk has bloomed. 

Moments later, Stephanie and Julian get into an argument and Stephanie quits. She visits Toni's apartment to come clean to her, telling her that she is actually Julian's nurse, and he has never been married. After she leaves, Julian arrives to tell Toni that his wife refuses to divorce him, but that he and Toni can continue their relationship. Toni is exasperated with his dishonesty, and decides to do a little lying of her own. She leaves him for Igor, but fools Julian into believing that she and Igor have been seeing each other all along.

Julian storms off and encounters Stephanie at the office the next morning. She has returned to pick up the cactus she keeps on her desk, which has flowered, like her. Julian tells her that he and Toni have split up and although he was initially devastated, he realized he was relieved he would not have to marry Toni. Stephanie is overjoyed and embraces him, just as he confesses he has fallen in love with her. They kiss.

Cast
 Walter Matthau as Julian Winston, a dentist
 Ingrid Bergman as Stephanie Dickinson, Winston's assistant
 Goldie Hawn as Toni Simmons, Winston's girlfriend
 Jack Weston as Harvey Greenfield, Winston's patient and friend
 Rick Lenz as Igor Sullivan, Toni's neighbor, a writer 
 Vito Scotti as Señor Arturo Sánchez, a diplomat and patient of Winston
 Irene Hervey as Mrs. Durant, a patient of Winston
 Eve Bruce as Georgia, Harvey Greenfield's date
 Irwin Charone as Toni's employer, a record store manager
 Matthew Saks as Stephanie Dickinson's nephew

Release
The film premiered at two locations in New York City, the Paris Theater and Astor Theatre, on Monday, December 15, 1969.

Reception
The film was a box office success, becoming the ninth highest-grossing film of 1969.

Howard Thompson of The New York Times stated that "both the expansive scenario of I. A. L. Diamond and the flexible direction of Gene Saks open up and even ventilate the story". Roger Ebert gave the film 3½ stars out of four and declared that "the chemistry works" and "the movie is better than the play". Gene Siskel gave the film two stars out of four, writing, "This is a film in the old style, but not in the good old style. The lines are neither current nor witty." Variety wrote that the names of the stars "should pack some boxoffice punch. The film, however, drags, which is probably the [worst] thing that can be said of a light comedy. It's due to sloppy direction by Gene Saks and the miscasting of Matthau opposite Miss Bergman." Charles Champlin of the Los Angeles Times wrote, "Cactus Flower was a successful Broadway comedy and it translates to the screen quite nicely ... It is a craftily contrived piece of silliness enacted by competent and attractive people: Laugh In Goldie Hawn, Walter Matthau and Ingrid Bergman in that order of laudability."

In her first major film role, Goldie Hawn, once described by Time as the "dizzy cream puff who is constantly blowing her lines [on Laugh-In]", was praised in that same magazine for being "a natural reactress; her timing is so canny that even her tears run amusingly". Hawn's performance in the film won her the Academy Award for Best Supporting Actress.

On review aggregator Rotten Tomatoes, the film holds an approval rating of 85% based on 20 reviews, with an average score of 6.9/10. On Metacritic, the film received a score of 67 based on 5 reviews, indicating "generally favorable reviews".

Awards and nominations

Music

The film score was composed, arranged and conducted by Quincy Jones and featured vocalists Sarah Vaughan and Johnny Wesley and the soundtrack album was released on the Bell label in 1969.
The Vinyl Factory stated, "The music Jones supplied for this trippy film is Quincy's nod to psychedelia and sunshine pop – covering the Monkees' 'I'm a Believer', and 'I Wonder What She's Doin' Tonight', which was penned by Boyce and Hart, also of Monkees fame. Sarah Vaughan adds some gravity with 'The Time for Love Is Anytime', and there's even a groovy version of 'To Sir, With Love'. A sweet cocktail." The score also contains a second Monkees cover, "She Hangs Out", written by Jeff Barry, another artist who had worked with the Monkees.

Track listing
All compositions by Cynthia Weil and Quincy Jones except where noted
 "The Time for Love Is Anytime ("Cactus Flower" Theme)" − 2:48
 "To Sir with Love" (Mark London, Don Black) − 3:30
 "I Needs to Be Bee'd With" (Quincy Jones, Ernie Shelby) − 2:35
 "I'm a Believer" (Neil Diamond) − 3:00
 "The Time for Love Is Anytime ("Cactus Flower" Theme)" − 3:25
 "The Time for Love Is Anytime ("Cactus Flower" Theme) [Piano Version]" − 3:25
 "She Hangs Out (Doin' the Dentist)" (Jeff Barry) − 3:45
 "The Spell You Spin" (Quincy Jones, Dave Grusin, Bob Russell) − 3:48
 "I Wonder What She's Doin' Tonight" (Tommy Boyce, Bobby Hart) − 3:00
 "The Time for Love Is Anytime ("Cactus Flower" Theme) [Organ Version]" − 3:17

Personnel
 Orchestra arranged and conducted by Quincy Jones including
 Sarah Vaughan (track 1), Johnny Wesley (track 3) − vocals
 Jimmy Haskell − arranger (tracks 1, 5, 6 & 10)
 Bobby Bryant  − fluegelhorn
 Artie Kane, Roger Kellaway − piano
 Dennis Budimir − guitar
 Earl Palmer − drums
 Carol Kaye − electric bass
 Gene Estes, Emil Richards, Larry Bunker − percussion

Influence
The film has been remade several times. An unauthorized Hindi version titled Maine Pyaar Kyun Kiya?, starring Salman Khan, Sushmita Sen and Katrina Kaif, was released in 2005. In 2007, it was remade in Kannada as Sathyavan Savithri, starring Ramesh Aravind. An English language remake, Just Go With It, starring Adam Sandler and Jennifer Aniston, was released in 2011. An Egyptian version titled Nos Sa'a Gawaz (Half-Hour Marriage), starring Rushdy Abaza, Shadia and Adel Imam, was released in 1969.

Also, the film is recognized by American Film Institute in this list:
 2002: AFI's 100 Years...100 Passions – Nominated

References

External links
 
 
 

1969 films
1969 comedy films
American comedy films
American films based on plays
Columbia Pictures films
Films directed by Gene Saks
Films featuring a Best Supporting Actress Academy Award-winning performance
Films featuring a Best Supporting Actress Golden Globe-winning performance
Films scored by Quincy Jones
Films set in New York City
Films with screenplays by I. A. L. Diamond
1960s English-language films
1960s American films